Murder, Inc. was an American industrial music supergroup formed in 1991, featuring vocalist Chris Connelly, Killing Joke members Geordie Walker, Paul Raven, "Big Paul" Ferguson, John Bechdel, and former Public Image Ltd drummer Martin Atkins.

Formation

Martin Atkins joined Killing Joke as their drummer and later their manager in 1990. The band recorded the 1990 album Extremities, Dirt and Various Repressed Emotions after which they parted ways with singer Jaz Coleman. Keeping the line-up of Killing Joke (minus Coleman) together, Atkins formed Murder, Inc., recruiting Chris Connelly (who had worked with Ministry amongst others) to replace Coleman and former Killing Joke member Paul Ferguson as a second drummer.

The band released their debut EP, Corpuscle, which featured tracks remixed by J. G. Thirlwell, in 1991 followed by their eponymous album in 1992. The album was recorded by Steve Albini who had already worked with Atkins on the Pigface album Gub and with Connelly on his album Whiplash Boychild. The band played five live dates before disbanding later in 1992, due to "internal squabbles".

In 1998 Connelly, Atkins, and Walker reconvened and formed another industrial supergroup with Jah Wobble called The Damage Manual.

Personnel
Martin Atkins – drums
John Bechdel – keyboards
Chris Connelly – vocals
Paul Ferguson – drums
Paul Raven – bass
Geordie Walker – guitar

Discography
Corpuscle (EP, 1992)
Murder, Inc. (1992, Invisible Records / re-released in 1993 with altered track listing through Futurist Records)
Locate Subvert Terminate – The Complete Murder, Inc. (collection album, 1999)

References

External links
 [ Murder, Inc.] at Allmusic
 Murder, Inc. discography at Chris Connelly's website

British industrial music groups
Killing Joke
Musical groups disestablished in 1992
Musical groups established in 1991
1991 establishments in Illinois
Industrial rock musical groups
British alternative rock groups